Conus shaskyi is a species of sea snail, a marine gastropod mollusk in the family Conidae, the cone snails, cone shells or cones.

These snails are predatory and venomous. They are capable of "stinging" humans.

Description
The size of the shell attains 35 mm.

Distribution
This marine species occurs of the Cocos (Keeling) Islands.

References

 Tenorio, M.J., J.K. Tucker & H. Chaney, 2012, Conilithidae & Conidae : The Cones of the Eastern Pacific, A Conchological Iconography
 Puillandre N., Duda T.F., Meyer C., Olivera B.M. & Bouchet P. (2015). One, four or 100 genera? A new classification of the cone snails. Journal of Molluscan Studies. 81: 1-23

External links
 World Register of Marine Species
 

shaskyi
Gastropods described in 2012